Steeven Joseph-Monrose (born 20 July 1990) is a French professional footballer who plays as a right winger for French Championnat National 3 club Gazélec Ajaccio.

Career

Club
Joseph-Monrose began his career playing for his local club in Bondy, AS Bondy, before moving to CRAF Liévin. He arrived at RC Lens in 2002. On 20 July 2008 he signed his first professional contract with the Pas-de-Calais-based side, which would keep him there until 2013. He was given the number 34 kit. He made his professional debut on 13 October 2008 in Lens' 1–0 win over En Avant Guingamp coming on as a substitute playing 20 minutes. On 11 January 2010, RC Lens loaned him to LB Châteauroux until 30 June 2010.

On 23 June 2017, Gabala FK announced the signing of Joseph-Monrose on a two-year contract, with Gabala confirmed his release at the end of his contract on 4 June 2019.

On 16 June 2019, Neftçi PFK announced the signing of Joseph-Monrose on a two-year contract. On 26 June 2021, Neftçi confirmed the departure of Joseph-Monrose after they decided not to renew his contract.

International
Born in France, Joseph-Montose is of Haitian descent. Joseph-Monrose played on the France U-19 squad. On 25 May 2009, he was selected to the under-20 squad to participate in the 2009 Mediterranean Games.

Career statistics

Club

Honours

Club
Lens
Ligue 2 (1): 2008–09
Genk
Belgian Cup (1): 2012–13
Gabala
 Azerbaijan Cup (1): 2018–19

Individual
Azerbaijan Premier League Top Scorer (1): 2019–20

Personal life
Joseph-Monrose is of Haitian descent.

References

External links
 LFP Profile

1990 births
Living people
Sportspeople from Bondy
French footballers
France under-21 international footballers
France youth international footballers
French sportspeople of Haitian descent
Ligue 1 players
Ligue 2 players
Belgian Pro League players
Azerbaijan Premier League players
RC Lens players
LB Châteauroux players
K.V. Kortrijk players
K.R.C. Genk players
Stade Brestois 29 players
Gabala FC players
Neftçi PFK players
Competitors at the 2009 Mediterranean Games
Association football midfielders
French expatriate footballers
Expatriate footballers in Belgium
French expatriate sportspeople in Belgium
Expatriate footballers in Azerbaijan
French expatriate sportspeople in Azerbaijan
Mediterranean Games competitors for France
Footballers from Seine-Saint-Denis